The Tereñes Formation or Tereñes Marl is a Late Jurassic (Kimmeridgian) geologic formation in Asturias, Spain. The grey marls of the formation were deposited in a lagoonal environment at a muddy coast along a temporary inland sea. The lower section of the formation comprises silty and chalky sandstones with desiccation cracks and ripple marks, then becomes a bituminous, prominently ostracod-bearing, pelecypod shell chalk, lime chalk marl and marl. Fossil tracks have been reported from the formation.

Fossil content 
The following fossils were reported from the formation:
Dinosaurs
 Theropoda indet.
 ?Allosauroidea indet.
 Neosauropoda indet.
 Ankylopollexia indet.
Crocodylimorphs
 Dakosaurus sp.
 cf. Machimosaurus sp.
Ichnofossils
 Gigantosauropus asturiensis
 Hispanosauropus hauboldi

See also 
 List of dinosaur-bearing rock formations
 List of stratigraphic units with sauropodomorph tracks
 Sauropod tracks

References

Bibliography 
 
 
 
 
  
 

Geologic formations of Spain
Jurassic System of Europe
Jurassic Spain
Kimmeridgian Stage
Marl formations
Lagoonal deposits
Ichnofossiliferous formations
Paleontology in Spain
Formations